Isnotú  is a tiny town located in the Venezuelan Andean state of Trujillo, roughly 269 miles (or 433 km) west of Caracas. Its geographical coordinates are 9° 22' 12" North, 70° 42' 1" West, and has an average daytime temperature of 25 °C (77 °F).

Isnotú was founded by Bishop Mariano Martí on April 13, 1777. Its name came from the Indian tribe that inhabited the area at the time of its founding, the Isnotúes.

Isnotú is the birthplace of Blessed Doctor José Gregorio Hernández. Daily thousands of people come there to visit the Santuario (the Sanctuary), which was built as a sign of gratitude for miraculous healings attributed to Dr. Hernández.

Sources

Populated places in Trujillo (state)
Populated places established in 1777
1777 establishments in the Spanish Empire